Kumaraswami Kamaraj (15 July 1903 – 2 October 1975), popularly known as Kamarajar was an Indian independence activist and politician who served as the Chief Minister of Madras State (Tamil Nadu) from 13 April 1954 to 2 October 1963. He was the founder and the president of the Indian National Congress (Organisation), widely acknowledged as the "Kingmaker" in Indian politics during the 1960s. He also served as the president of the Indian National Congress for two terms i.e. four years between 1964–1967 and was responsible for the elevation of Lal Bahadur Shastri to the position of Prime Minister of India after Nehru's death and Indira Gandhi after Shastri's death. He was the Member of Parliament, Lok Sabha during 1952–1954 and 1969–1975. He was known for his simplicity and integrity. He played a major role in developing the infrastructure of the Madras state and worked to improve the quality of life of the needy and the disadvantaged.

As the president of the INC, he was instrumental in steering the party after the death of Jawaharlal Nehru. As the chief minister of Madras, he was responsible for bringing free education to the disadvantaged and introduced the free Midday Meal Scheme while he himself did not complete schooling. He was awarded with India's highest civilian honour, the Bharat Ratna, posthumously in 1976. US Vice-president Hubert Humphrey, called  Kamaraj as "one of the greatest political leaders in all the countries of the free world"  in January 1966.

Early life
Kamaraj was born on 15 July 1903 in Virudhunagar, Tamil Nadu, to Kumaraswami Nadar  and Sivakami Ammal. His name was originally Kamatchi, later changed to Kamarajar. His father Kumaraswami Nadar was a merchant. Kamaraj had a younger sister named  Nagammal. Kamaraj was first enrolled in a traditional school in 1907 and in 1908 he was admitted to Yenadhi Narayana Vidhya Salai. In 1909 Kamaraj was admitted in Virudupatti High School. Kamaraj's father died when he was six years old, his mother was forced to support the family. In 1914 Kamaraj dropped out of school to support his mother.

Politics
As a young boy, Kamaraj worked in his uncle's provision shop and during that time he began to attend public meetings and processions about the Indian Home Rule movement. Kamaraj developed an interest in prevailing political conditions by reading newspapers daily. The Jallianwala Bagh massacre was the decisive turning point in his life - he decided to fight for national freedom and to bring an end to foreign rule. In 1920, when he was 18, he became active in politics. He joined Congress as a full-time political worker. In 1921 Kamaraj organised public meetings at Virudhunagar for Congress leaders. He was eager to meet Gandhi, and when Gandhi visited Madurai on 21 September 1921, Kamaraj attended the public meeting and met Gandhi for the first time. He visited villages carrying Congress propaganda.

In 1922 Congress boycotted the visit of the Prince of Wales as part of the Non-Cooperation Movement. He came to Madras and took part in the event. In 1923–25 Kamaraj participated in the Nagpur Flag Satyagraha. In 1927, Kamaraj started the Sword Satyagraha in Madras and was chosen to lead the Neil Statue Satyagraha, but this was given up later in view of the Simon Commission boycott.

Kamaraj went to jail for two years in June 1930 for participating in the "Salt Satyagraha". led by Rajagopalachari at Vedaranyam; he was released before he served the two-year sentence as a result of 1931 Gandhi–Irwin Pact. In 1932, Section 144 was imposed in Madras prohibiting the holding of meetings and organisation of processions against the arrest of Gandhi in Bombay. In Virdhunagar, under Kamaraj's leadership, processions and demonstrations happened every day. Kamaraj was arrested again in January 1932 and sentenced to one year's imprisonment. In 1933 Kamaraj was falsely charged in the Virudhunagar bomb case. Varadarajulu Naidu and George Joseph argued on Kamaraj's behalf and proved the charges to be baseless. At the age of 34, Kamaraj entered the Assembly winning the Sattur seat in the 1937 election.

Kamaraj conducted a vigorous campaign throughout the state asked people not to contribute to war funds when Arthur Hope, the Madras Governor, was collecting contributions to fund for the Second World War. In December 1940 he was arrested again at Guntur, under the Defence of India rules for speeches that opposed contributions to the war fund, and sent to Vellore Central Prison while he was on his way to Wardha to get Gandhi's approval for a list of Satyagrahis. While in jail, he was elected as Municipal Councillor of Virudhunagar. He was released nine months later in November 1941 and resigned from this post as he thought he had greater responsibility for the nation. His principle was "One should not accept any post to which one could not do full justice".

In 1942, Kamaraj attended the All-India Congress Committee in Bombay and returned to spread propaganda material for the Quit India Movement. The police issued orders to all the leaders who attended this Bombay session. Kamaraj did not want to be arrested before he took the message to all district and local leaders. finishing his work and sent a message to the local police that he was ready to be arrested. He was arrested in August 1942. He was under detention for three years and was released in June 1945. This was his last prison term. Kamaraj was imprisoned six times by the British for his pro-Independence activities, that added up to more than 3,000 days in jail.

During the anti-cow slaughter agitation in 1966, Kamaraj's house near the parliament was burnt down by Hindutva groups. The agitation was incited by Bharatiya Jana Sangh, the political arm of the Rashtriya Swayamsevak Sangh (RSS). They also surrounded his house with an intent to attack him. Kamaraj had a narrow escape.

Chief Minister

On 13 April 1954, Kamaraj became the Chief Minister of Madras Province. To everyone's surprise, Kamaraj nominated C. Subramaniam , who had contested his leadership, to the newly formed cabinet.

As Chief Minister, Kamaraj removed the family vocation based Modified Scheme of Elementary education 1953 introduced by Rajaji. He reopened 6000 schools closed in the previous government by C. Rajagopalachari citing financial reasons and reopened 12,000 more schools. The State made immense strides in education and trade. New schools were opened, so that poor rural students had to walk no more than three kilometres to their nearest school. Better facilities were added to existing ones. No village remained without a primary school and no panchayat without a high school. Kamaraj strove to eradicate illiteracy by introducing free and compulsory education up to the eleventh standard. He introduced the Midday Meal Scheme to provide at least one meal per day to the lakhs of poor school children. He introduced free school uniforms to weed out caste, creed and class distinctions among young minds.

During the colonial era, the local education rate was at 7%; after Kamaraj's reforms, it reached 37%. Apart from increasing the number of schools, steps were taken to improve standards of education. To improve standards, the number of working days was increased from 180 to 200; unnecessary holidays were reduced; and syllabi were prepared to give opportunity to various abilities. Kamaraj and Bishnuram Medhi (Governor) took efforts to establish IIT Madras in 1959.

Major irrigation schemes were planned in Kamaraj's period. Dams and irrigation canals were built across higher Bhavani, Mani Muthar, Aarani, Vaigai, Amaravathi, Sathanur, Krishnagiri, Pullambadi, Parambikulam and Neyyaru among others. The Lower Bhavani Dam in Erode district brought  of land under cultivation.  of land benefited from canals constructed from the Mettur Dam. The Vaigai and Sathanur systems facilitated cultivation across thousands of acres of lands in Madurai and North Arcot districts respectively. Rs 30 crores were planned to be spent for Parambikulam River scheme, and 150 lakhs of acres of lands were brought under cultivation; one third of this (i.e. 56 lakhs of acres of land) received a permanent irrigation facility. In 1957–61  1,628 tanks were de-silted under the Small Irrigation Scheme, and 2,000 wells were dug with outlets. Long-term loans with 25%  subsidy were given to farmers. In addition farmers who had dry lands were given oil engines and electric pump sets on an instalment basis.

Industries with huge investments in crores of Rupees were started in his period: Neyveli Lignite Corporation, BHEL at Trichy, Manali Refinery, Hindustan raw photo film factory at Ooty, surgical instruments factory at Chennai, and a railway coach factory at Chennai were established. Industries such as paper, sugar, chemicals and cement took off during the period.

Kamaraj Plan
Kamaraj remained Chief Minister for three consecutive terms, winning elections in 1957 and 1962. Kamaraj noticed that the Congress party was slowly losing its vigour.

On Gandhi Jayanti day 2 October 1963, he resigned from the post of the Chief Minister. He proposed that all senior Congress leaders should resign from their posts and devote all their energy to the re-vitalization of the Congress.

In 1963 he suggested to Nehru that senior Congress leaders should leave ministerial posts to take up organisational work. This suggestion came to be known as the Kamaraj Plan, which was designed primarily to dispel from the minds of Congressmen the lure of power, creating in its place a dedicated attachment to the objectives and policies of the organisation. Six Union Ministers and six Chief Ministers including Lal Bahadur Shastri, Jagjivan Ram, Morarji Desai, Biju Patnaik and S.K. Patil followed suit and resigned from their posts. Impressed by Kamaraj's achievements and acumen, Prime Minister Jawaharlal Nehru felt that his services were needed more at the national level. In a swift move he brought Kamaraj to Delhi as the President of the Indian National Congress. Nehru realised that in addition to wide learning and vision, Kamaraj possessed enormous common sense and pragmatism. Kamaraj was elected the President of Indian National Congress on 9 October 1963.

National politics
After Nehru's death in 1964, Kamaraj successfully navigated the party through turbulent times. As the president of INC, he refused to become the next Prime Minister himself and was instrumental in bringing to power two Prime Ministers, Lal Bahadur Shastri in 1964 and Nehru's daughter Indira Gandhi  1966. For this role, he was widely acclaimed as the "kingmaker" during the 1960s.

When the Congress split in 1969, Kamaraj became the leader of the Indian National Congress (Organisation) (INC(O)) in Tamil Nadu. The party fared poorly in the 1971 elections amid allegations of fraud by the opposition parties. He remained the leader of INC(O) until his death in 1975.

Electoral history

Nagercoil  by-election victory
The death of A. Nesamony in 1968 led to the by-election in Nagercoil Lok Sabha constituency. Realising the popularity of Kamaraj in this constituency and the potential danger posed by Kamaraj's election after the Indian National Congress party's debacle in 1967 election, C. Rajagopalachari wrote in Swarajya, the magazine of the Swatantra Party, about the need to defeat him and appealed to C. N. Annadurai to support M. Mathias, the Swatantra Party candidate. Annadurai deputed M. Karunanidhi, the then Minister for Public Works, to Nagercoil to work in support of Mathias. Despite the efforts, Kamaraj won decisively with a 1,28,201-vote margin on 8 January 1969.

Personal life
During his tenure as Chief Minister, when the municipality of Virudhunagar provided a direct water connection to his house in his hometown, Kamarajar ordered it to be disconnected immediately as he did not want any special privileges. He refused to use the Z-level security that was provided to him as the CM of Tamil Nadu and instead travelled with just one police patrol vehicle. He did not marry, did not own any property and was never tempted by power. When he died, he left behind 130 rupees, 2 pairs of sandals, 4 shirts, 4 dhotis and a few books.

Death

Kamaraj died at his home, on Gandhi Jayanti day (2 October 1975), which also was the 12th anniversary of his resignation. He was aged 72 and died in his sleep due to a heart attack.

Legacy
 In 1976, he was posthumously awarded Bharat Ratna, India's highest civilian honor.
 In 2004, the Government of India issued a commemorative coin of ₹ 100 and ₹ 5 denomination to mark the centenary celebrations of him.
 Terminal-1 of Chennai International Airport is named "Kamaraj Terminal".
 Ennore Port in Chennai was renamed to Kamarajar Port Limited.
 Maraimalai Nagar Railway Station also named after him as Maraimalai Nagar Kamarajar Railway Station.
 His statue was erected in Parliament of India and Marina Beach to honor him.
 Madurai University is renamed as Madurai Kamaraj University in his honor.
 North Parade Road in Bengaluru and Parliament Road in New Delhi were named as "Kamaraj Road".
 Marina Beach Road in Chennai and Ettayapuram Road in Thoothukudi were named as "Kamarajar Salai".

Popular culture
In 2004 a Tamil-language film titled Kamaraj was made based on the life history of Kamaraj. The English version of the film was released on DVD in 2007.

References

External links

 Complete history about Kamarajar
 On the Footsteps of Kamarajar

1903 births
1975 deaths
India MPs 1952–1957
India MPs 1967–1970
India MPs 1971–1977
Chief ministers from Indian National Congress
Chief Ministers of Tamil Nadu
Indian Hindus
Indian independence activists
Indian independence activists from Tamil Nadu
Indian National Congress (Organisation) politicians
Indian National Congress politicians from Tamil Nadu
Indian nationalists
Indian political party founders
Indian socialists
Indian Tamil politicians
Indian tax resisters
Lok Sabha members from Tamil Nadu
Madras MLAs 1957–1962
People from Virudhunagar district
Presidents of the Indian National Congress
Prisoners and detainees of British India
Recipients of the Bharat Ratna
Tamil Nadu politicians
Madras MLAs 1962–1967